Chaytor is a surname, and may refer to:

David Chaytor (born 1949), British politician
Sir Edward Chaytor (1868–1939), New Zealand Army general
Joshua Chaytor (1903–1937), Irish-born cricketer
Henry John Chaytor (1871–1954), British academic
Steven Chaytor (born 1976), Australian politician
Tom Chaytor (1869–1951), Irish tennis player
William Chaytor (disambiguation), several people

See also
Chater
Dave Chaytors